Amin Torkashvand is an Iranian professional footballer. He currently plays for Gahar Zagros F.C. in the Iran Pro League.

Career
Torkashvand played for Rah Ahan from 2005 to 2009 and then he joined the newly found club Damash Gilan, where he scored 5 goals in his first year. In the following season, he scored 4 goals for the team, helping them gain promotion to the Iran Pro League. For the 2011–12 season he joined another Azadegan League team Parseh Tehran.

References

External links
 Profile at Persianleague

Living people
Iranian footballers
Damash Gilan players
Rah Ahan players
Gahar Zagros players
1982 births
Association football midfielders